The Central Kansas League was a Class D level baseball league established in 1908, playing through 1912. Member teams were based exclusively in Kansas. The Central Kansas League evolved from and into the Kansas State League.

History
The original Kansas State League ceased independent operations in 1911, combined with the Central Kansas League. After five seasons of play, the Central Kansas League subsequently changed its name to back to the Kansas State League for the 1913 and 1914 seasons before disestablishing. The league champions in 1909 and 1910 were the Ellsworth Blues. 

There is an ongoing debate about whether former US President Dwight Eisenhower played professional baseball in 1911 for the Junction City Soldiers prior to attending West Point.

Cities represented 
This is a complete list of the teams which played under the Central Kansas League.

Abilene, KS: Abilene Red Sox 1909; Abilene Reds 1910 
Beloit, KS: Beloit 1909–1910 
Chapman, KS: Chapman 1910 
Clay Center, KS: Clay Center Cubs 1909–1911 
Concordia, KS: Concordia Travelers 1910–1911 
Ellsworth, KS: Ellsworth Worthies 1908–1910 
Great Bend, KS: Great Bend Millers 1912
Junction City, KS: Junction City Soldiers 1909–1912 
Little River, KS: Little River 1908 
Lyons, KS: Lyons Lions 1912
Manhattan, KS: Manhattan Maroons 1909–1911; Manhattan Giants 1912 
McPherson, KS: McPherson Merry Macks 1908 
Minneapolis, KS: Minneapolis Minnies 1908–1909, 1912 
Newton, KS: Newton Browns 1908; Newton Railroaders 1912 
Salina, KS: Salina Trade Winners 1908–1910; Salina Insurgents 1912

Standings & statistics 
1908 Central Kansas League - schedule

1909 Central Kansas League
 No Playoffs held 

1910 Central Kansas League - schedule
 Beloit moved to Chapman July 20.

1911 Central Kansas League
 The league disbanded July 21. Playoff: Concordia 4 games, Junction City 3.
 
1912 Central Kansas League - schedule
Newton moved to Minneapolis July 12. No Playoffs held

Notable players 
 Fred Blanding (played under a pseudonym)
 Harry Chapman
 John Misse
 Ross Reynolds 
 Harry Short
 Chick Smith

References 

Defunct minor baseball leagues in the United States
Baseball leagues in Kansas
Sports leagues established in 1908
Sports leagues disestablished in 1912
1908 establishments in Kansas
1912 disestablishments in Kansas